Naira is a feminine given name.

List of people with the given name 

 Naira Beatriz Vier (born 1996), Brazilian female badminton player.
 Naira Gelashvili (born 1947), Georgian writer
 Naira Hovakimyan (born 1966), Armenian game theorist
 Naira Zohrabyan (born 1965), Armenian politician

See also 

 Nigerian naira

Given names
Feminine given names
Armenian feminine given names
Georgian feminine given names